Dykh-Tau or Dykhtau (that is derived from Turkic "dik dagh" which means Jagged Mount), is a mountain located in Kabardino-Balkaria, Russia; its peak stands about  north of the border with Georgia.

Access
Dykh-Tau is best accessed from the north (Russia). Bezingi village may be reached from Nalchik in Kabardino-Balkaria with infrequent public transport, here a 4WD vehicle must be hired. From here it takes a further 2 days to reach the base of the climb.

Climbing routes
This is one of the Caucasian Peaks, facing the  Bezingi Wall across the Bezingi Glacier. The first ascent in 1888 by Albert Mummery and Heinrich Zurfluh of Meiringen was a major achievement at the time. Their route up the SW Ridge is no longer used as the normal route which is now the North Ridge graded 4B (Russian Grading).

Starting from Misses Kosh the ridge is accessed by crossing the West Ridge of Misses-Tau then continuing to the Russian Bivouac located by a hanging glacier descending from the North Ridge of Dykhtau, 4 hours from Misses-Kosh. Once a notch between Misses-Tau and Dykhtau is gained, the North Ridge is followed to the summit. Allow 2 and a half days from the Russian Bivouac, there are several good bivouac sites on the North Ridge (Details and map).

Mapping
Various Soviet military maps annotated in the Cyrillic script can found on the internet; two of the maps cover the Dykhtau area.

References

External links 

 
  summitpost.org: Dykhtau

Mountains of Kabardino-Balkaria
Seven Second Summits
Five-thousanders of the Caucasus
Climbing areas of Russia